George Thomas Barrington (January 29, 1944 – November 8, 2002) was an American football running back in the National Football League for the Washington Redskins and New Orleans Saints.  He played college football at Ohio State University and was drafted in the third round of the 1966 NFL Draft.  Barrington was also selected in the sixteenth round of the 1966 AFL Draft by the Kansas City Chiefs.

See also 
 List of NCAA major college yearly punt and kickoff return leaders

External links
 

1944 births
2002 deaths
Sportspeople from Lima, Ohio
Players of American football from Ohio
American football running backs
Ohio State Buckeyes football players
Washington Redskins players
New Orleans Saints players